In software engineering, an amelioration pattern is an anti-pattern formed when an existing software design pattern was edited (i.e. rearranged, added or deleted) to better suit a particular problem so as to achieve some further effect or behavior. In this sense, an amelioration pattern is transformational in character.

References

External links 
 Amelioration Pattern at the Portland Pattern Repository

Software design patterns